Izvoarele is a commune in Prahova County, Muntenia, Romania. It is composed of six villages: Cernești, Chirițești, Homorâciu, Izvoarele, Malu Vânăt and Schiulești.

A quiet, mostly self-sufficient commune, it has been slowly developing since the 1990s, with small improvements such as the mid-2000s paving of the main east/west road that had been a dirt road. Modern architecture is to be seen in some of the recently built houses, while some are very old, contrasting the mixed population of rich and poor. A railway bridge made of massive stone lies to the south of the railway station.

The river Teleajen flows through Homorâciu. The Crasna is a right tributary of this river; it discharges into the Teleajen in Izvoarele.

References

Communes in Prahova County
Localities in Muntenia